Bu Zhong Yi Qi Tang is a Chinese classic herbal formula. In Japanese kampo, it is known as "Hochū-ekki-tō" ( (it is also known as Kampo #41). It is commonly made into Chinese patent medicine.

Variations
The formula was created by Lǐ Dōng-yuán. It was published in "Treatise on the Spleen and Stomach" in 1249.

There are many variations of the formula proportions. Each maker of Chinese patent medicine changes the proportions of the herbs slightly. The proportions are standardized in the Japanese kampo formula, however. Some herbs may be changed also. For example, rén shēn (ginseng root) may be replaced with dǎng shēn ("poor man's ginseng").

The formula was also changed slightly when it was borrowed as a Japanese kampo formula. Some Chinese species of herbs were replaced with herbs found in Japan. For example, bái zhú (Atractylodes macrocephala) was replaced with cāng zhú (Atractylodes lancea).

Chinese classic herbal formula

Japanese kampo formula

See also
Chinese herbology
Chinese patent medicine
Chinese classic herbal formula
Ginger
Kampo list
Kampo herb list

References

External links
Biographies of the creators of many Chinese classic herbal formulas
Hochū-ekki-tō (Kampo #41) 

Traditional Chinese medicine pills